Marcos André Rocha Costa (born April 6, 1979, in Salvador, Bahia) is a boxer from Brazil, who won the bronze medal in the light welterweight division (– 64 kg) at the 2003 Pan American Games in Santo Domingo, Dominican Republic.

References
 Folha Online

1979 births
Living people
Light-welterweight boxers
Boxers at the 2003 Pan American Games
Brazilian male boxers
Pan American Games bronze medalists for Brazil
Pan American Games medalists in boxing
Medalists at the 2003 Pan American Games
Sportspeople from Salvador, Bahia
20th-century Brazilian people
21st-century Brazilian people